The United States Post Office Canal Street Station, originally known as "Station B", is a historic post office building located at 350 Canal Street at the corner of Church Street in the Tribeca neighborhood of Manhattan, New York City. It was built in 1937, and designed by consulting architect Alan Balch Mills for the Office of the Supervising Architect of the United States Department of the Treasury.

The building is a two-story and symmetrically massed, clad with buff terra cotta panels with a black terra cotta base in the Moderne style.  It features a fluted terra cotta frieze with a tarnished silver finish. According to the AIA Guide to New York City, "[t]he articularted inset bay windows on Church Streets are a wonderful mannerism ... [that] give[s] the allusion of scanning the streets north and south, and add plasticity to the building." The interior features a relief executed in 1938 by artist Wheeler Williams and titled "Indian Bowman."

The building was listed on the National Register of Historic Places in 1989.

See also
National Register of Historic Places listings in New York County, New York

References
Notes

External links

Canal Street
Government buildings completed in 1937
Art Deco architecture in Manhattan
Tribeca